Henk Barnard (8 August 1922, Rotterdam – 16 April 2003, Laren) was a Dutch writer of children's literature, journalist and television director.

Career 

Between 1960 and 1962 Barnard worked as a television director for the television series Pipo en het zingende zwaard and Pipo in Kaliefland. Barnard also worked on the series De proemel (1962) and Ja zuster, nee zuster between 1966 and 1968.

In 1972, Barnard published the children's book De Marokkaan en de kat van tante Da (1972) for which he received the Gouden Griffel award a year later. Barnard was also awarded the Gouden Griffel for his book Kon Hesi Baka / Kom gauw terug. For his book Laatste nacht in Jeque Barnard received the Nienke van Hichtum-prijs in 1979.

In 1974, Barnard wrote 2 is te veel, the Kinderboekenweekgeschenk on the occasions of the Boekenweek.

For his contributions to children's literature, he received the Staatsprijs voor kinder- en jeugdliteratuur in 1982.

Barnard's books were illustrated by his wife Reintje Venema and Fiel van der Veen.

Awards 
 1973: Gouden Griffel, De Marokkaan en de kat van tante Da
 1977: Gouden Griffel, Kon Hesi Baka / Kom gauw terug
 1979: Nienke van Hichtum-prijs, Laatste nacht in Jeque
 1982: Staatsprijs voor kinder- en jeugdliteratuur

References

External links 

 Henk Barnard (in Dutch), Digital Library for Dutch Literature
 

1922 births
2003 deaths
Dutch children's writers
20th-century Dutch journalists
Gouden Griffel winners
Nienke van Hichtum Prize winners